"Stuck on Repeat" is a song by English singer and songwriter Little Boots from her debut extended play (EP), Arecibo (2008), and later appearing on her debut studio album, Hands (2009). Written by Little Boots, Greg Kurstin and Joe Goddard, and produced by Goddard, the song was released as a promotional single in the United Kingdom in February 2008.

Background and writing
"Stuck on Repeat" was originally recorded as a rough demo by Little Boots after she had composed a loop that sounded like Giorgio Moroder. Excited about the demo she sent it to several musicians and record labels, but never heard back from them. A friend of Goddard sent him the demo much to the embarrassment of Little Boots. Goddard, however, saw potential in the song and volunteered to remix it. Eventually, he rewrote and produced the song with Little Boots. "Stuck on Repeat" was composed by Little Boots and Goddard with Australian singer Kylie Minogue in mind. It was recorded in Goddard's bedroom. Little Boots described the recording process as "weird" because she mostly communicated with Goddard through e-mail. Whenever he was in London she would visit his home and record her vocals. The track was inspired by the disco era and describes romantic infatuation using music as a metaphor.

Track listings
UK promotional CD single #1
(Released )
"Stuck on Repeat" – 6:58
"Stuck on Repeat" (Dub) – 7:38

UK promotional CD single #2
(Released )
"Stuck on Repeat" (Full Length) – 6:51
"Stuck on Repeat" (Dub) – 7:40
"Stuck on Repeat" (Edit) – 3:58

UK promotional CD single #3
(Released )
"Stuck on Repeat" (Fake Blood Remix) – 6:28
"Stuck on Repeat" (Rory Phillips Re-edit) – 6:18

UK promotional CD single #4
(Released )
"Stuck on Repeat" (Ali Wilson Tekelec Remix) – 8:17

UK promotional CD single #5
(Released 2008)
"Stuck on Repeat" (Alexander Robotnick Remix) – 8:48
"Meddle" (Joker Remix) – 3:51
"Meddle" (Treasure Fingers Remix) – 5:40

UK limited-edition promotional 12" single
(Released )
A. "Stuck on Repeat" (Alexander Robotnick Remix) – 8:48
B. "Meddle" (Joker Remix) – 3:51

References

2008 songs
Little Boots songs
Songs written by Greg Kurstin
Songs written by Little Boots